Berkay is a Turkish given name for males, derived from the Turkish words "berk" which means "bright like lightning" and "ay" which means "moon". Notable people named Berkay include:

 Berkay Besler (born 1999), Turkish racing driver
 Berkay Can Değirmencioğlu ((born 1993), Turkish footballer 
 Berkay Candan (born 1993), Turkish basketball player
 Berkay Dabanlı (born 1990), Turkish-German footballer
 Berkay Onarıcı (born 1987), Turkish footballer
 Berkay Özcan (born 1998), Turkish footballer
 Berkay Sefa Kara (born 1999), Turkish footballer
 Berkay Samancı (born 1989), Turkish footballer
 Berkay Şahin (born 1981), Turkish singer
 Berkay Yılmaz (born 1998), Turkish footballer

Turkish masculine given names